Mount Mercy University is a private Catholic liberal arts university in Cedar Rapids, Iowa, founded by the Sisters of Mercy in 1928.

Students take a core of liberal arts courses as a foundation for areas of study including English, fine arts, history, mathematics, multicultural studies, natural science, philosophy, religious studies, social science and speech/drama. The university offers more than 40 undergraduate programs and seven graduate programs, a number of which are available online.

Campus
Mount Mercy University's 40-acre campus is in a tree-lined residential neighborhood in the heart of Cedar Rapids, Iowa (population 134,268). It contains the Our Mother of Sorrows Grotto, which is listed as a historic district on the National Register of Historic Places.

History

Mount Mercy University was founded as a two-year college for women in 1928 by the Sisters of Mercy of Cedar Rapids, Iowa. These sisters, whose order was founded in 1831 by Catherine McAuley in Dublin, Ireland, have been active in Cedar Rapids since 1875. The college was an outgrowth of their concerns about the education of women.

In 1957, Mount Mercy became a four-year institution and awarded its first bachelor's degree in 1959. The college received accreditation as a baccalaureate institution by the North Central Association in 1960. In 1968, the Sisters of Mercy transferred their legal authority and responsibility to a self-perpetuating independent board of which three members would always be Sisters of Mercy.  Mount Mercy College became coeducational in 1969. While integrating a strong liberal arts component, the college has always emphasized professional development from its early involvement, as a junior college, on business courses and teacher education. The departments of nursing, education, and social work were accredited in the 1960s and 1970s as the four-year programs developed. Initiated in 1997, the Adult Accelerated program, a joint Mount Mercy University/Kirkwood Community College accelerated degree completion program for working adults meets an important community workforce development need.

On August 23, 2010, the institution was re-designated as a university.

Presidents
Mary Ildephonse Holland, 1928–1933, 1946–1961
Mary Cornelia Burke, 1933 to 1939
Mary Maura Marron, 1939–1946
Mary Agnes Hennessey, 1961–1977
Thomas R. Feld, 1977–1999
Robert Pearce, 1999–2006
Christopher R.L. Blake, 2006–2013
Norm R. Nielsen, 2013-2014
Laurie Hamen, 2014–2020
Robert Beatty, July 1, 2020 – September 9, 2020
Tim Laurent, Serving as interim-president as of September 9, 2020 - 2021
Todd A. Olson, July 21, 2021 – present

Catholic identity

Mount Mercy is sponsored by the Institute of the Sisters of Mercy of the Americas, through the Conference for Mercy Higher Education. 
The Campus Ministry team supports students’ faith development and spiritual life through daily mass, retreats, service-learning opportunities and vocation discernment activities.

Mass during fall and spring semesters is usually held at 7:30 p.m. Sundays and 12:00 a.m. Thursdays, subject to change.

Athletics
The Mount Mercy athletic teams are called the Mustangs. The university is a member of the National Association of Intercollegiate Athletics (NAIA), primarily competing in the Heart of America Athletic Conference (HAAC) since the 2016–17 academic year, after spending a season as an NAIA Independent within the Association of Independent Institutions (AII) during the 2015–16 school year. The Mustangs previously competed in the defunct Midwest Collegiate Conference (MCC) from 1988–89 to 2014–15 (when the conference dissolved).

Mount Mercy competes in 20 intercollegiate varsity sports. Men's sports include baseball, basketball, bowling, cross country, golf, soccer, track & field (indoor and outdoor) and volleyball; while women's sports include basketball, bowling, cross country, golf, soccer, softball, track & field (indoor and outdoor) and volleyball; and co-ed sports include competitive cheer and competitive dance. Varsity and junior varsity programs are available in several sports.

Intramural activities include basketball, volleyball, golf, flag football, softball and cross country. 45% of traditional undergrads are student-athletes.

Facilities
The Rinderknecht Athletic Center (RAC), Mount Mercy's state-of-the-art wellness and athletic performance center, opened in June 2019, was made possible by a substantial gift from John Rinderknecht, Mount Mercy trustee and president of Ram Development Company. The dynamic training facility serves Mount Mercy's 500+ student-athletes and 2,100+ students, faculty, and staff. Located across the street from the Robert W. Plaster Athletic Complex—the transformed warehouse includes batting cages, golf hitting bays and putting green, a sprint track, athletic training room, fitness/cardio/weight equipment, a dynamic movement area for yoga, and more. Renovations included a new HVAC system and new flooring, roof, siding, and windows that look onto the athletic complex. The neighboring building, formerly the Barry K. Wendt building, is also a new addition to Mustang athletics and houses administrative offices.

The Robert W. Plaster Athletic Complex (PAC) opened in September 2017, on 22 acres of land adjacent to the main campus, finally giving six of our 18 intercollegiate programs something they'd never had—a home field advantage. The Robert W. Plaster Athletic Complex is home to the Mustang baseball, softball, men's and women's track & field, and men's and women's soccer.

Achievements
Mount Mercy's 18 athletic teams have won 50 conference team titles and qualified for 40+ national events. Over 120 students have been named NAIA Scholar-Athletes in the past three years, including a record 67 in the 2018–19 academic year.  In 2018–19: Two NAIA national team qualifiers, 14 individual qualifiers, eight NAIA all-Americans, 67 Daktronics-NAIA Scholar-Athletes, 116 all-conference performers.

References

External links
 
 Official athletics website

 
Liberal arts colleges in Iowa
Education in Cedar Rapids, Iowa
Educational institutions established in 1928
Roman Catholic Archdiocese of Dubuque
Education in Linn County, Iowa
Buildings and structures in Cedar Rapids, Iowa
Tourist attractions in Cedar Rapids, Iowa
Catholic universities and colleges in Iowa
Former women's universities and colleges in the United States
Sisters of Mercy colleges and universities
Association of Catholic Colleges and Universities
1928 establishments in Iowa